Octadecyltrichlorosilane (ODTS or n-octadecyltrichlorosilane) is an organosilicon chemical. It is used in semiconductor industry to form self-assembled monolayer thin films on silicon dioxide substrates. Its structural chemical formula is CH3(CH2)17SiCl3. It is flammable, reacts with water, and is also sensitive to air. It is corrosive and can severely damage mucous membranes. Its EINECS number is 203-930-7.

Octadecyltrichlorosilane is an amphiphilic molecule consisting of a long-chain alkyl group (C18H37–) and a polar head group (SiCl3–), which forms self assembled monolayers (SAMs) on various oxidic substrates.

ODTS finds its use in molecular electronics, as thin insulating gates in metal-insulator-semiconductor field-effect transistors.

Dodecyltrichlorosilane, an ODTS analog with shorter alkyl chain, is used for the same purpose as well.

ODTS-PVP films are used in organic-substrate LCD displays.

References

Chlorosilanes
Thin films